There are several places called Killington:

Killington, Cumbria, a village and civil parish in Cumbria, England
Killington Beck, the location of Killington Lake (or Killington Reservoir) in Cumbria
Killington Lake services, a service area on the M6 motorway in England
Killington, Devon, a hamlet in Devon, England
Killington, Vermont, a town in Rutland County, Vermont, USA
Killington Peak, a mountain in Killington, Vermont
Killington Ski Resort, a ski resort on Killington Peak

Other uses:
Dylan Killington, a fictional character on the American television series Studio 60 on the Sunset Strip